Zaimka is a rural locality (a selo) and the administrative centre of Zaimkinsky Selsoviet, Duvansky District, Bashkortostan, Russia. The population was 220 as of 2010. There are 5 streets.

Geography 
Zaimka is located 105 km northwest of Mesyagutovo (the district's administrative centre) by road. Ust-Ayaz is the nearest rural locality.

References 

Rural localities in Duvansky District
Aetaayaa